Iowa Highway 148 (Iowa 148) is a highway which runs in a north–south direction in southwestern Iowa. The southern end of Iowa Highway 148 is at the Missouri border southwest of Bedford and just northeast of Hopkins, Missouri. The highway continues south into Missouri as Missouri Route 148. The northern end of Iowa 148 is at Interstate 80 (I-80) and U.S. Highway 6 (US 6) north of Anita.

Route description

Iowa 148 begins as a continuation of Route 148 northeast of Hopkins, Missouri.  Between Hopkins and Bedford, the highway heads northeast, running parallel to the east fork of the One Hundred and Two River.  At Bedford, the river goes east around the city while the highway turns north into town.  For one-quarter mile, Iowa 148 overlaps Iowa 2, from Madison Street to Bent Street.

The route heads due north from Bedford, but jogs to the west near Lake of Three Fires State Park, but returns to a due-north course near Gravity. The highway then travels  to an intersection with US 34 at Corning. The highway goes through the eastern side of Corning, wrapping around its north side, and then bearing west again before straightening out to the north.

Iowa 148 continues north from Massena, heading due north through the rolling farmland of Cass County for  until it reaches Anita.  At Anita, the route curves into town along Michigan Street and crosses the Iowa Interstate Railroad right before it meets Main Street, the corner of Main and Michigan represents the eastern end of Iowa 83.  Iowa 148 briefly turns onto Main Street, heading northeast, and then turns back due north.  Four miles (6.4 km) north of Anita, Iowa 148 ends at exit 70 along I-80 / US 6.

History
Portions of Iowa 148 have been in Iowa's Primary Highway System since its inception in 1920.  The section between Bedford and Corning was part of Primary Road No. 16, most of that route was replaced by US 169 upon its designation in 1930.  By 1947, Iowa 148 had been designated from the Missouri state line to Anita.  When US 6 was relocated onto I-80 between the Atlantic and Adair exits in 1972, Iowa 148 was extended north to its present-day end at I-80.

Major intersections

References

External links

148